Drive is the fourteenth and final solo album by British musician Robert Palmer released in 2003. Critics hailed it as the grittiest and most heartfelt album of Palmer's career.

Background
Initially approached by guitarist Carl Carlton to contribute to the 2001 Robert Johnson tribute album Hellhound on My Trail, for which Palmer recorded "Milk Cow's Calf Blues" with Carlton on guitars, Palmer was then invited by Faye Dunaway to provide the soundtrack to her 2001 directorial debut The Yellow Bird, set in Mississippi and New Orleans during the 1940s and 1950s. Palmer took both signs as a good omen, and the impetus for Drive was born. Palmer died four months after the album's release from a heart attack on September 26, 2003.

After more thoroughly researching this particular genre of music, Palmer assembled a list of fifty possible tracks, and then began the arduous task of whittling that list down to a manageable set of twelve.  The selections from Drive can best be described as a loose collection of both standard and contemporary blues compositions (Robert Johnson, Little Willie John, Keb' Mo'), with a smattering of other genres, including folk (Nicolai Dunger) and calypso (Mighty Sparrow), prompting Palmer to call the result "a gut-buckety swamp thing."

Recording and charts
The recording and mixing of Drive took place in both Logic Studios (Milan, Italy) and Palmer's home studio (Lugano, Switzerland).  Because of the satisfaction and enthusiasm having recorded the initial twelve songs, Palmer decided to cut three more tracks ("29 Ways [To My Baby's Door]," "It Hurts Me Too," "Stupid Cupid"), this time at the Sphere in London.

The album peaked at No. 10 on the US Blues albums chart.

Track listing
"Mama Talk To Your Daughter" (J. B. Lenoir, Alex Atkins) (2:27)
"Why Get Up?" (Bill Carter, Ruth Ellsworth) (3:01)
"Who's Fooling Who?" (Steve Barri, Michael Omartian, Harvey Price, Daniel Walsh) (2:49)
"Am I Wrong?" (Kevin R. Moore,  Keb' Mo') (2:04)
"TV Dinners" (Frank Beard, Billy Gibbons, Dusty Hill) (3:24)
"Lucky" (Carl Carlton, Robert Palmer) (2:22)
"Stella" (Slinger Francisco) (3:59)
"Dr Zhivago's Train" (Nicolai Dunger) (3:58)
"Ain't That Just Like A Woman" (Claude Demetrius, Fleecy Moore) (1:59)
"Hound Dog" (Jerry Leiber, Mike Stoller) (2:03)
"Crazy Cajun Cake Walk Band" (Jim Ford, Lolly Vegas, Pat Vegas) (3:08)
"Need Your Love So Bad" (Little Willie John, Mertis John Jr.) (2:14)

Personnel 
 Robert Palmer – lead and backing vocals, bass (1-6, 8–12)
 Dr. Gabs – pianos, Hammond organ, synthesizers, bass (7)
 Carl Carlton – guitars
 Mauro Spina – drums (1-7, 9–12), percussion (1-7, 9–12)
 James Palmer – drums (8), percussion (8)
 Franco Limido – harmonica
 Mary Ambrose – backing vocals

Production 
 Robert Palmer – producer 
 Pino Pischetola – recording, mixing 
 Michael Frank – photography

References

2003 albums
Robert Palmer (singer) albums
Blues albums by English artists
Albums produced by Robert Palmer (singer)